The UP Fighting Maroons are the varsity women's football team of the University of the Philippines. They compete at the University Athletic Association of the Philippines (UAAP), as well as at the PFF Women's League, the top-flight domestic women's football league in the Philippines.

The team was also among the participants of the Philippine Ladies' Football National League, which was organized by the Philippine Ladies' Football Association in 1981. UP clinched the league title besting Philippine Air Force.

The team also participated at the 2015 PFF Women's Cup where they fielded two teams, namely University of the Philippines-X and University of the Philippines-Y.

The team won its first UAAP title in Season 78 in 2016 under the watch of their head coach, Anto Gonzales who also led the men's UP  team to a football UAAP title.

Squad
As of 3 December 2016

 

Source: Pinay Futbol

Officials
As of 3 December 2016

See also
UP Fighting Maroons

References

University of the Philippines
University Athletic Association of the Philippines football teams
Women's football clubs in the Philippines
PFF Women's League clubs